Milka Canić (18 July 1944 – 19 October 2016) was the supervisor of the Serbian TV quiz show "TV Slagalica" (formerly known as "Muzička Slagalica"), which has aired every day at 19:00 CET on RTS channel 1 since 1993.

Career
Canić graduated from the University of Belgrade Faculty of Philology and was a professor of the Serbian language at the gymnasium in Priština, at the military gymnasium in Belgrade, and at XV Belgrade gymnasium.

Canić worked for five years on RTS program "Srbija danas" (Serbia today), and after that she became part of "Slagalica" crew about 10 years ago, and gained enormous popularity in Serbia since then.

On 2008 Serbian parliamentary election Milka Canić was a candidate of the Democratic Party of Serbia (DSS).

Death
Milka Canić died in Belgrade on 19 October 2016 after a long illness, aged 72.

References

External links

1944 births
2016 deaths
Serbian schoolteachers
Serbian television personalities
University of Belgrade Faculty of Philology alumni